No Exit (also known as Fatal Combat) is a 1995 Canadian action film directed by Damian Lee and starring Jeff Wincott and Sven-Ole Thorsen as the leading hero and main villain, respectively. It is about deadly martial arts combat, and the hero is forced into fights by evil money-men.

Plot
Far above the Arctic Circle is based a TV channel, on which there is only one program—"No Exit". Melee and death in the air. University Professor John Stoneman is abducted be the channel owner. No way out and no chance to survive. For John Stoneman there seems to be no escape.

References

External links

 

1995 films
1995 action films
1995 martial arts films
Films directed by Damian Lee
Films produced by Damian Lee
Films about kidnapping
Films with screenplays by Damian Lee
1990s English-language films
Canadian action films